Buccinaria pygmaea is a species of sea snail, a marine gastropod mollusk in the family Raphitomidae.

Distribution
This marine species occurs off New Caledonia.

References

 Bouchet P. & Sysoev A. (1997) Revision of the Recent species of Buccinaria (Gastropoda: Conoidea), a genus of deep-water turrids of Tethyan origin. Venus, Japanese Journal of Malacology, 56:93-119

External links
 Bouchet, Philippe, et al. "A quarter-century of deep-sea malacological exploration in the South and West Pacific: where do we stand? How far to go." Tropical deep-sea Benthos 25 (2008): 9-40
 MNHN, Paris: holotype

pygmaea
Gastropods described in 1997